Lithuanian District Heating Association (LDHA) is an organization that represents  Lithuanian district heat utilities, organizations and others associated energy structures in the district heating sector in Lithuania.

LDHA was established on 24 February 1998. Members of association produce and supply around 95-99 % of the total heat through the district heating network in Lithuania.

LDHA  has 42 members, 31 of the total membership comprise district heating companies and 11 companies whose activities are closely linked to the heat sector.

References

External links 

 

Trade associations based in Lithuania
Residential heating
1998 establishments in Lithuania
Electric power companies of Lithuania